Kai Lawonn (born 1985) is a German computer scientist. He works in the field of exploratory data analysis and visualization and has been a full professor at the University of Jena at the Institute of Computer Science since 2019.

Life 
Lawonn studied Mathematics and Physics at Free University of Berlin from 2006 to 2011 and graduated with a diploma. He received his Ph.D. in Computer Science from Otto von Guericke University Magdeburg from 2012 to 2014 and the Venia Legendi in Computational visualistics in 2017. From 2015 to 2019, he was an assistant professor of medical visualization at the University of Koblenz-Landau and then moved to the University of Jena as an assistant professor in 2019, funded by the Carl-Zeiss-Stiftung. There, he has been a professor of visualization and exploratory data analysis since 2021. His research group specializes in visualization of medical data, illustrative visualization, data analysis, visual analytics, virtual reality, human-computer interaction, etc.

Prizes and honors 

 2016 Eurographics PhD Award
 2020 EuroVis – Young Researcher Award
 2021 DFG Heinz Maier-Leibnitz-Preis
 2021 Capital – Top 40 under 40

External links 

 Homepage at University of Jena

References 

German computer scientists

1985 births
Living people